The Sovereign Individual: Mastering the Transition to the Information Age is a 1997 non-fiction book by William Rees-Mogg and James Dale Davidson. Later republished on 26 August 1999 by Touchstone, it forecasts the development of the twenty-first century; focusing on the rise of the internet & cyberspace, digital currency & digital economy, self-ownership and decentralization from the State.

The Sovereign Individual has been recommended by members of the cryptocurrency community such as Naval Ravikant and Brian Armstrong. In 2020, the book was reprinted with a preface written by PayPal co-founder Peter Thiel.

Overview 
Originally, the book was published in 1997 as The Sovereign Individual: How to Survive and Thrive During the Collapse of the Welfare State and later it was republished in 1999 under its current title by Touchstone.

Chapters 
The book contains eleven chapters and has 446 pages (400 pages of plain text, 46 pages of references, notes, and an appendix. The latest edition of the book with Thiel's foreword adds two more pages).

The chapters are:

 The Transition of the Year 2000: The Fourth Stage of Human Society
 Megapolitical Transformations in Historic Perspective
 East of Eden: The Agricultural Revolution and the Sophistication of Violence
 The Last Days of Politics: Parallels Between the Senile Decline of the Holy Mother Church and the Nanny State
 The Life and Death of the Nation-State: Democracy and Nationalism as Resource Strategies in the Age of Violence 
 The Megapolitics of the Information Age: The Triumph of Efficiency over Power
 Transcending Locality: The Emergence of the Cybereconomy 
 The End of Egalitarian Economics: The Revolution in Earnings Capacity in a World Without Jobs
 Nationalism, Reaction, and the New Luddites
 The Twilight of Democracy
 Morality and Crime in the "Natural Economy" of the Information Age

Content 
Rees-Mogg and Davidson's main thesis centers around self-ownership and the Individual's independence from the State, forecasting the end of the nations and nation-states. In a chapter titled Nationalism, Reaction, and the New Luddites, they criticize nationalism and appeal more to giving the Individual control over his destiny rather than the collectiveness given by nationalism. Rees-Mogg and Davidson also refer to a transition to the year 2000, being a birth of a new stage of Western civilization in the coming of the new millennium.

With the rise of the information society, they argue, the Individual would be freed from the oppression of government and the drags of prejudice: 

Rees-Mogg and Davidson also suggested that digital currency/cybermoney would supersede fiat currency: 

Rees-Mogg and Davidson's recall of "mathematical algorithms that have no physical existence" is similar to the functional mechanism of certain cryptocurrencies such as Bitcoin and other proof-of-work currencies.

Rees-Mogg and Davidson have also predicted that with the rise of this new cyberspace, and consequently cybermoney, it will become harder for a nation-state to collect taxes from its citizens. They compare the State to a farmer keeping cows in a field to be milked but that "soon, the cows will have wings". They predict that for the government to collect taxes from its citizens in this type of society, it would have to violate human rights, even traditionally civil countries would have to resort and "turn nasty":

Reception 
Peter Thiel, who wrote the preface to the 2020 printing, wrote that, among the many things that Rees-Mogg and Davidson got wrong, the biggest part was "perhaps their misjudgement in the rise of China and the prosperity of Hong Kong as an ideal type of government [under colonial rule]".

In his 2018 book, The Bitcoin Standard, Saifedean Ammous mentions and calls the The Sovereign Individual'''s prediction of digital currency "remarkable". Ammous also gives insight on The Sovereign Individual during the section titled Individual Sovereignty'', while also commending Davidson and Rees-Mogg's prediction of a digital currency as "remarkable".

See also 

 Self-ownership
 Cyberspace
 Cryptocurrency

Notes

References

External links 
 The Sovereign Individual at Simon & Schuster
 The Sovereign Individual  First Touchstone Edition at Archive.org

British non-fiction books
1997 non-fiction books
English-language books
Simon & Schuster books
Books about the Internet
Decentralization